The Chemistry of Death is a novel by the British crime fiction writer Simon Beckett, first published in 2006. The novel introduced the character of Dr David Hunter, who has gone on to feature in other novels by the writer.
The Chemistry of Death was nominated for the Duncan Lawrie Dagger by the Crime Writer's Association in 2006.

The book was adapted into a six-part television series The Chemistry of Death, streaming on Paramount+ in the UK on January 19, 2023.

Plot
Forensics expert David Hunter is recovering from a shattering tragedy three years earlier. While he is working in an isolated Norfolk village as a doctor, a woman's mutilated corpse is discovered. Police want to exploit Hunter's forensic knowledge to help identify the killer, but he is wary of involvement. Another woman disappears and the small community in which Hunter has taken refuge is divided by suspicion, including suspicion of Hunter himself.

References

2006 British novels
Dr David Hunter (series)
Novels set in Norfolk
Bantam Books books